To Live and Die in L.A.  is the third studio album by English new wave band Wang Chung. It was released on 30 September 1985 by Geffen and is their first recording as a duo of lead vocalist Jack Hues and bassist Nick Feldman following the departure of drummer Darren Costin. The album served as the soundtrack for the 1985 film To Live and Die in L.A, directed by William Friedkin. Instead of following up the success that Points on the Curve (1983) had provided them, the band switched gears to produce an original motion picture soundtrack. The switch allowed for them to experiment with different styles of music from the more conventional pop music found on their previous studio album.

The album peaked at No. 85 on the US Billboard 200 but it failed to chart in their home country. The album's title track, "To Live and Die in L.A.", was released as the first single from the album and it peaked at No. 41 on the US Billboard Hot 100. "Wake Up, Stop Dreaming" was the second single to be released from the album but it failed to chart.

In 1996, Geffen Goldline re-released the album on CD but all CD versions of the album have remained out of print since. Universal Music Enterprises re-released the album on vinyl in 2015.

Background
According to William Friedkin, director of the film To Live and Die in L.A., the main reason he chose Wang Chung to compose the soundtrack was because the band "stands out from the rest of contemporary music... What they finally recorded has not only enhanced the film, it has given it a deeper, more powerful dimension."  This, of course, was his response after listening to the band's previous studio album, Points on the Curve (1983). In fact, he loved the album so much, that he took two of the songs straight off of the album, "Wait", and "Dance Hall Days" and used them as part of the soundtrack. "Wait" plays at the end credits of the movie, and is their only song to appear on two different non-compilation albums. Every song on the soundtrack, excluding the title song, "Dance Hall Days" and "Wait", was written and recorded within a two-week period. Only after Wang Chung saw a rough draft of the film did they produce the title song.

On the original vinyl and cassette release, side one was all vocal tracks, side two all instrumental.

Critical reception

In a retrospective review for AllMusic, critic Kelvin Hayes wrote that "To Live and Die in L.A. will appeal to those who enjoy the more dramatic spheres of Wang Chung's music." Concluding that the album is "a good budget-priced recording for those with the right set of ears."

Track listing
All songs written and composed by Wang Chung; all songs produced by Wang Chung, except where noted.

Credits
All songs published by Chong Music Ltd., adm. by Warner-Tamerlane Publishing Corp. BMI.
Executive producers: John Kalodner, David Massey
Arranged by William Friedkin
Music supervision: John Kalodner
Production supervisor: Bob Weiner
"Lullaby" engineered by Brad Davis
Mastered by Greg Fulginiti at Artisan Sound Recorders, Los Angeles
Art director/design: Steve Gerdes
Graphic design: Pablo Ferro
Thanks to William Friedkin, Bud Smith and all at Todd A.O., Maggie Abbott and all at Triad, Bob Weiner, Ed Rosenblatt and Elaine Black.
Management: David Massey at Domino Directions, Ltd., London

Chart performance

References

External links

Wang Chung (band) albums
1985 soundtrack albums
Geffen Records soundtracks